David Gantar (born June 27, 1975) is a Canadian soccer referee for PRO from Edmonton, Alberta. He has been a Canadian National Referee since 2004, and became a FIFA Referee in 2011. Gantar had a highly successful first year of international duty, officiating at three international tournaments — including one major tournament — and in the CONCACAF Champions League and 2014 FIFA World Cup Qualification.

On April 27, 2019, Gantar was the match official for the debut game in the Canadian Premier League

Outside refereeing, Gantar has an MBA from the University of Alberta and is the CFO and vice president of Stanley Construction Ltd.

Gantar retired following the 2021 Season. His final match was the 2021 Canadian Championship Final.

Career 

Gantar had a successful first year as a FIFA referee, attending three international tournaments.  His year included appointment to the Gold Cup (the continental championship) ahead of fellow Canadian FIFA Referee Paul Ward.  The appointment came despite Ward's seniority and experience; coupled with Gantar's inclusion on CONCACAF's Elite Referee List.

Card statistics 

Statistics for all competitions, including domestic, CONCACAF and international friendlies/tournaments.

References

External links
  (archive)
 
 
 

Living people
1975 births
Soccer people from Alberta
Sportspeople from Edmonton
Major League Soccer referees
Canadian soccer referees
CONCACAF Gold Cup referees
CONCACAF Champions League referees
North American Soccer League referees